Heart of the North is a 1938 American adventure film directed by Lewis Seiler and written by Lee Katz and Vincent Sherman. The film stars Dick Foran, Gloria Dickson, Gale Page, Allen Jenkins, Patric Knowles, and Janet Chapman. The film was released by Warner Bros. on December 10, 1938. It is based on the novel with the same name, written by William Byron Mowery.

The Canadian Mounties abandon horses to  pursue a gang of gold and fur thieves, using boats, canoes and airplanes.

Cast          
 Dick Foran as Sergeant Alan Baker
 Gloria Dickson as Joyce MacMillan
 Gale Page as Elizabeth Spaulding
 Allen Jenkins as Corporal Bill Hardsock
 Patric Knowles as Corporal Jim Montgomery
 Janet Chapman as Judy Montgomery
 James Stephenson as Inspector Stephen Gore
 Anthony Averill as Constable Whipple
 Joe Sawyer as Red Crocker
 Joe King as Mac Drummond
 Russell Simpson as Dave MacMillan
 Arthur Gardner as Constable Larry Young
 Garry Owen as Tom 'Tommy' Ryan
 Pedro de Cordoba as Father Claverly
 Alec Harford as Lunnon Dick 
 Robert Homans as Boat Captain Ashman
 Anderson Lawler as Constable Burgoon
 Bruce Carruthers as Constable Pedeault

Plot
Cpl. Jim Montgomery of the R.C.M.P. (Patric Knowles) takes his little daughter Julie (Janet Chapman) from Fort Endurance in the Northwest Territories to school in Edmonton on the river steamer Arctic Queen. Six men hold up the boat when they stop for wood, gun down Cpl. Montgomery in front of his daughter, disable the steamer and steal its cargo of furs and gold. They escape by canoe. R.C.M.P. Inspector Stephen Gore (James Stephenson) sends Sgt Alan Baker (Dick Foran) with five Mounties after the bandits in a motor launch and canoe, but orders him to split his unit in two. This leaves Sgt. Baker short of manpower when they are ambushed by the bandits. Sgt. Baker is forced to end the pursuit and bring a wounded comrade back to Fort Endurance. At Fort Endurance, Sgt. Baker is confined to quarters for not arresting trapper Dave McMillan (Russell Simpson) after some of the stolen furs are found in his shed. Sgt. Baker’s girlfriend Elizabeth Spaulding (Gale Page) lies about Dave McMillan being part of the gang in order to have Sgt. Baker thrown out of the Mounties. Dave McMillan is arrested. While the other Mounties go out to pursue the bandits, Sgt. Baker is confined to quarters. Sgt. Baker and R.C.M.P. Cpl. Bill Hardsock (Allen Jenkins) steal a forestry department float plane to search the lakes and rivers. They find the bandits and strafe their canoes, leaving two bandits to be pursued on land. Sgt. Baker captures the bandit leader, who admits that they are working for the corrupt shipping agent Red Crocker (Joe Sawyer). A pursuing forestry plane lands and takes Sgt. Baker, Cpl. Hardsock and the bandit leader back to Fort Endurance, just in time to save Dave McMillan from being lynched by a group of angry gold miners. Dave McMillian’s beautiful daughter Joyce (Gloria Dickson) is very grateful to Sgt. Baker and his girlfriend Elizabeth parts with him. Sgt. Baker is promoted to inspector and given command of the Fort Endurance R.C.M.P. detachment.

References

External links 
 
 
 
 

1938 films
Warner Bros. films
American adventure films
1938 adventure films
Films directed by Lewis Seiler
Films scored by Adolph Deutsch
Northern (genre) films
Royal Canadian Mounted Police in fiction
1930s English-language films
1930s American films
English-language adventure films